Presidential elections were held in Finland on 15 and 29 January 2006 which resulted in the re-election of Tarja Halonen as President of Finland for a second six-year term.

The first round of voting in Finnish presidential elections always takes place on the third Sunday of January, in this case 15 January 2006. As no candidate received more than half of the vote, a second round was held on 29 January between the two highest placed candidates from the first round, Tarja Halonen and Sauli Niinistö. Tarja Halonen, the incumbent, won the final round by 3.6 percentage points. The newly elected president formally took office for her second term on 1 March, and would have done so on 1 February, had no run-off been necessary (Constitution 55 §).

Advance voting is possible in Finnish elections, and the dates for this in the first round were the 4th, 5th and 7th to 10 January. Finnish citizens voting abroad could vote from the 4th to the 7th of January. An advantage to advance voting is that those doing so have a wider choice of polling stations (typically post offices, such as the one shown here), whereas on the actual election day the polling stations are fixed, usually schools, libraries or town halls.

Candidates

 
The candidates are listed below following their candidate numbers. This list was confirmed by the Electoral District Committee of Helsinki on 15 December 2005.
 (See below)
 Bjarne Kallis (Christian Democrats)
 Sauli Niinistö (National Coalition Party)
 Timo Soini (True Finns)
 Heidi Hautala (Green League)
 Henrik Lax (Swedish People's Party)
 Matti Vanhanen (Centre Party); the incumbent Prime Minister of Finland,
 Arto Lahti (independent)
 Tarja Halonen (Social Democratic Party; also supported by the Left Alliance); the current incumbent

The law states that candidate numbers start from number 2. There are various justifications, such as preventing any candidate from using the slogan "number 1" for publicity, preventing ambiguity between the numbers 1 and 7, or preventing votes from being accidentally discounted because of a resemblance to a tickmark.

Campaign

Themes
The main theme of discussion in the campaign preceding the election was the President's powers and whether they should be limited further. The Green League's candidate Heidi Hautala suggested that the President be completely stripped of all powers relating to foreign affairs and foreign policy, but this proposal met with fierce resistance from the three candidates of the largest parties – Tarja Halonen, Matti Vanhanen and Sauli Niinistö. Halonen, the main left-wing candidate and incumbent president, has further indicated that the president's powers should not be increased either, since it would, in her opinion, reduce the degree of democratic decision-making.

Another important election theme was the threat of international terrorism and how to counter it. The main right-wing candidate, Sauli Niinistö, stated in the last presidential debate that he would consider Finland's membership "in a more European" North Atlantic Treaty Organization (NATO) after 2008 to achieve such an end, but this was strongly rejected by the other main candidates. The only candidate openly embracing NATO-membership was the other right-wing candidate, Henrik Lax, of the Swedish People's Party. According to a poll carried out by the Taloustutkimus polling agency in July 2005, most Finnish people believe that NATO membership would increase the risk of international terrorism in Finland instead of decreasing it. This is also the view held by Vanhanen, of the Centre Party, and Halonen.

Other themes included Christian values emphasised by Bjarne Kallis; stronger ties around the Baltic Sea and a stronger European Union by Henrik Lax; criticism of the EU by Timo Soini and the state of entrepreneurship and the returning of Karelia by Arto Lahti.

Sauli Niinistö raised the state of work as another theme. His campaign slogan was "President of the workers" (Työväen presidentti) and this provoked many union activists and left-wing supporters and voters. However, he was also criticised for trying to lure left-wing voters to vote for him with this slogan. Niinistö's campaign stated that there was neither "left-wing work" or "right-wing work" but only Finnish work for Finnish welfare.

International attention
American late night talk show host Conan O'Brien endorsed re-election for Tarja Halonen on his show due to a long-standing joke about his resemblance to incumbent president Halonen. The skits, commentary, and mock campaign ads were seen on Late Night with Conan O'Brien on SubTV, a Finnish cable channel, five days a week (with a brief delay). Markku Jääskeläinen, Halonen's campaign manager, noted that the frequent mention of Halonen's name was positive for their campaign, and the running bits on the show attracted international attention to the election.

Opinion polls
Here is a collection of latest poll results. The opinion pollsters' methods may vary, as do the samples and the conducting time, which give the differences.

The total percentages may exceed 100% due to rounding.

Two of the latest polls made by Taloustutkimus and Suomen Gallup raised discussion over whether Halonen would gain the 50%+ majority of the votes necessary to win the election in a single round. According to Helsingin Sanomat, the reason why Halonen's support has decreased in polls might be an increase in the number of people not wanting to reveal their favourite candidate: some of them plead to the secrecy of voting. The airtime and space given by the media for the candidates may have given the candidates with smaller support the opportunity to bring their opinions to the public, which might add to their support in the polls in question.

On the other hand, the latest poll conducted by Research International (2) showed no change in Halonen's popularity between the three different weeks.

The candidates and their supporters read their polls for their advantage. In Timo Soini's mind there was a big surprise waiting in the ballot boxes; he did, in fact, receive 3.4% of the vote, which was much more than the support for his True Finns party in the last parliamentary election. Tarja Halonen stated this election as being the only one showing such a big support to her: "The crossbar is trembling just right", she said on January 10, meaning the excitement of getting the majority of the votes. Sauli Niinistö publicly stated that there would be a second round between him and Halonen.

Results

Voting took place from 09:00 to 20:00 on both of the two election days, with specifically designated periods for advance voting before both the first and second rounds.  Every municipality was required by law to have at least one polling station.  Voting was organised abroad for expatriate Finnish citizens at Finnish embassies, consulates and honorary consulates worldwide. The candidates were voted for directly by the electorate.  Votes were counted nationally.

The counting of advance votes started at 15:00, and was expected to finish before 20:00, when the first preliminary results were announced.  The preliminary counting of the election day votes began at 20:00, after which the votes were delivered to the central election committee in Helsinki, which performed a recount.  The definitive result in Finnish presidential elections is required by law to be confirmed on the following Tuesday at 10:00 at the latest. However, enough votes are normally counted during the first hour after polling stations close for an unofficial, but clear, result to be announced.

A second round run-off was held on 29 January 2006 between Tarja Halonen (Social Democratic Party) and Sauli Niinistö (National Coalition Party).

Opinion polls predicted a close election. A January 19 poll (HS Gallup) gave Halonen 53% and Niinistö 47% of the vote. By comparison, in October 2005 a clear majority of 70% would have voted for Halonen when asked to choose between her and Niinistö.

Four of the six candidates who did not make it to the second round, Matti Vanhanen, Bjarne Kallis, Henrik Lax and Arto Lahti publicly expressed their support for Sauli Niinistö in the runoff election. This reflects a loose alliance termed porvariyhteistyö in the Finnish media, (roughly translated as "bourgeois collaboration"). According to Niinistö and Vanhanen, the main centre-right parties (the National Coalition Party and the Centre Party) had agreed about a year earlier on some level of co-operation to better compete with Halonen, who was supported by both the Social Democrats and Left Alliance.

First round results by province

Second round results by province

References

  Advance voting in Finland list of polling stations.
  Voting by Finns living abroad.
  People entitled to vote- whole country. (2006), Ministry of Justice Finland. Retrieved 01 Feb 2006.
   First round results.
  Second round results
  Poll showing Tarja Halonen's large level of support in October 2005.
  Conducted via telephone for YLE by Taloustutkimus on January 10 and 11, and the sample size was 1582 people. The margin of error is ± 2.5 percentage points.
  Conducted for MTV3 by Research International during the weeks 52, 1 and 2. The sample size was 1200 people (500 on weeks 52 and 1, 200 on week 2). The margin of error is ± 2.5 percentage For Halonen and ± 3 for Niinistö and Vanhanen.
  Conducted via telephone for Helsingin Sanomat by Suomen Gallup between January 5 and 7, and the sample size was 1500 people living in mainland Finland. The margin of error is ± 2.5 percentage For Halonen and ± 2 for Niinistö and Vanhanen.
  Conducted for Helsingin Sanomat by Suomen Gallup between December 27 and 29, and the sample size was 1401 people. The margin of error is ± 2.5 percentage points for the three major candidates.
  Conducted for Aamulehti and Turun Sanomat by MC-Info between December 12 and 29, and the sample size was 150 people. The margin of error is ± 1.55 percentage points for the three major candidates.
  Conducted for Helsingin Sanomat by Suomen Gallup between December 7 and 17, and the sample size was 1400 people. The margin of error is ± 2.5 percentage points.
  Conducted for YLE by Taloustutkimus, released December 9, and the sample size was 1400 people. The margin of error is ± 2.5 percentage points. Arto Lahti wasn't an option in this poll.
  Conducted for Helsingin Sanomat by Suomen Gallup, released November, and the sample size was ?, The margin of error is ± ?  percentage points. Arto Lahti wasn't an option in this poll.
  Conducted for YLE by Taloustutkimus, released early November, and the sample size was 1452 people. The margin of error is ± 2.5 percentage points. Arto Lahti wasn't an option in this poll.
 Constitution of Finland, originally published as Nr. 731/1999 in the Statute Book of Finland, later amended.

External links

 Presidential Elections 2006 at the Ministry of Justice's website
 Results, to be posted at a later date.
 Vaalit 2006 (YLE), presidential election pages provided by the national broadcaster YLE
 MTV3 vaalikone, website helping to select the best candidate, provided by the commercial broadcaster MTV3
 Presidentinvaalit 2006 (HS), the election website provided by Helsingin Sanomat, the biggest Finnish daily newspaper
 Foreign media and candidates in page of Ministry of Foreign Affairs

Campaign pages
 Tarja Halonen
 Heidi Hautala
 Bjarne Kallis
 Arto Lahti
 Henrik Lax
 Sauli Niinistö
 Timo Soini
 Matti Vanhanen

2006
Finland
2006
January 2006 events in Europe